The Corpus Christi Cathedral (or its full name Corpus et Sanguis Christi Cathedral) is a Roman Catholic
cathedral in Port Harcourt, Rivers State, Nigeria. It is the seat of the Bishop of Port Harcourt and serves as the headquarters of the Diocese of Port Harcourt. The cathedral church is dedicated to Bishop Edmund Fitzgibbon. It is located in D-line, a mixed-use neighbourhood of Port Harcourt.

History
Construction on the cathedral began in 1982 and was completed in 1991. Upon completion, Rev Fr. Joseph Kabari was posted from St. Mary’s parish to act
as the cathedral's first administrator. The first mass was celebrated on Sunday 11 October 1991. The formal dedication ceremony was held on 8 December 1991.

See also
List of Roman Catholic churches in Port Harcourt
Roman Catholic Diocese of Port Harcourt

References

External links
 with history of Corpus Christi

Churches in Port Harcourt
D-line, Port Harcourt
Churches in the Roman Catholic Diocese of Port Harcourt
Christian organizations established in 1982
Roman Catholic churches completed in 1991
20th-century Roman Catholic church buildings in Nigeria
Buildings and structures in Port Harcourt (local government area)
Roman Catholic cathedrals in Nigeria
Landmarks in Port Harcourt